Babu Himmat Sah was the founder and first ruler of the Kohra estate of Oudh (Now in Amethi district, Uttar Pradesh) and belongs from Bandhalgoti  clan of Rajput. He was the younger son of Raja Bikram Sah, who was the Raja of Amethi. He built Kohra on the day of Ganga Dussehra in 1636 and also established Lord Chaturbhuj and Shiva temple as the first establishment, then built Kohra Fort, where he was crowned. He was religious man and an ardent devotee of Lord Shiva.

See also 

 Kohra (estate)
 Amethi

References 

Rajput rulers
People from Amethi district
People from Amethi
Royalty
17th-century Indian monarchs
Indian royalty
Place of death unknown
Year of death unknown